John William Morris (born February 23, 1969) is an American film screenwriter and producer best known for his collaborations with director Sean Anders, including Spirited (2022), Daddy's Home (2015), and We're the Millers (2013).

Career
In 2005, he began his writing career by drafting the screenplay for the faux documentary film Never Been Thawed. In 2008, he co-wrote the raunchy comedy film Sex Drive. He co-wrote 2010's Hot Tub Time Machine and She's Out of My League. The following year, he wrote the family film Mr. Popper's Penguins.

He gained notability from scripting the 2013 comedy film We're the Millers. In 2014, he drafted the comedy film sequels Horrible Bosses 2 and Dumb and Dumber To. He wrote the 2015 film Daddy's Home and its 2017 sequel. In 2018, he scripted the comedy film Instant Family. He co-wrote the Christmas film Spirited (2022).

Filmography

References

External links
 

Living people
1983 births
American male screenwriters
People from Salt Lake City
Screenwriters from Utah